Henry Alexander MacRae (August 29, 1876 – October 2, 1944) was a Canadian film director, producer, and screenwriter during the silent era, working on many film serials for Universal Studios. One of a number of Canadian pioneers in early Hollywood, MacRae was credited with many innovations in film production, including artificial light for interiors, the wind machine, double exposures and shooting at night.

Biography
Henry MacRae was born in Toronto, Ontario, Canada on August 29, 1876, and died in Beverly Hills, California, United States on October 2, 1944, aged 68.

He was active as a director from 1912 to 1933, making more than 130 films, most of them silent. In addition to the many westerns and adventure films to his credit, he directed the first Thai-Hollywood co-production, Miss Suwanna of Siam, in 1923. 

His first "talkie" was the first Tarzan movie with sound, Tarzan the Tiger in 1929. He also directed several westerns starring Hoot Gibson, a Tom Mix western and movies featuring Rex the Wonder Horse.

His producer credits in the 1940s include such serial films as The Green Hornet and Flash Gordon Conquers the Universe.

Selected filmography

 In the Coils of the Python (1913)
 The Girl and the Tiger (1913)
 In the Secret Service (1913)
 The Werewolf (1913)
 The Trey o' Hearts (1914)
 Coral (1915)
 The Conspiracy (1916)
 Behind the Lines (1916)
 Liberty (1916)
 Guilty (1916)
 The Mystery Ship (1917)
 Man and Beast (1917)
 The Bronze Bride (1917)
 Money Madness (1917)
 Bull's Eye (1917)
 The Phantom Riders (1918)
 Elmo the Mighty (1919)
 The Dragon's Net (1920)
 Cameron of the Royal Mounted (1921)
 The Man from Glengarry (1922)
 Miss Suwanna of Siam (1923)
 Glengarry School Days (1923)
 Racing for Life (1924)
A Fight for Honor (1924)
The Price She Paid (1924)
 Tainted Money (1924)
 Ace of Spades (1925)
 The Scarlet Streak (1925)
The Fearless Lover (1925)
 Strings of Steel (1926)
 The Trail of the Tiger (1927)
 Wild Beauty (1927)
 Two Outlaws (1928)
 Wild Blood (1928)
 Burning the Wind (1929)
 Tarzan the Tiger (1929)
 The Ace of Scotland Yard (1929)
 The Harvest of Hate (1929)
 Smilin' Guns (1929)
 Plunging Hoofs (1929)
 The Indians Are Coming (1930)
 The Jade Box (1930)
 The Lost Special (1932)
 Flash Gordon (1936)
 Flash Gordon Conquers the Universe (1940)

References
 Richardson, Thomas (1993) , Cornell University. (Cached page retrieved October 13, 2005)

External links

 

1876 births
1944 deaths
Film directors from Toronto
People from Old Toronto
Writers from Toronto
Cinema pioneers
Film serial crew
Canadian expatriate film directors in the United States